The Serie B 1992–93 was the sixty-first tournament of this competition played in Italy since its creation.

Teams
SPAL, Monza, Ternana and Fidelis Andria had been promoted from Serie C, while Bari, Verona, Cremonese and Ascoli had been relegated from Serie A.

Final classification

Results

References and sources
Almanacco Illustrato del Calcio - La Storia 1898-2004, Panini Edizioni, Modena, September 2005

Serie B seasons
2
Italy